The 1944 UK & Ireland Greyhound Racing Year was the 19th year of greyhound racing in the United Kingdom and Ireland.

Roll of honour

Summary
The popularity of racing continued to grow with attendances and totalisator turnover both rising once again despite the wartime restrictions imposed in many other aspects of life. Attendances and annual totalisator turnover increased significantly once again. The totalisator turnover saw an increase in excess of 20% from the previous year when a figure of 74,845,814 was declared.

The leading greyhound company, the Greyhound Racing Association (GRA) recorded a record profit of £578,000 but the GRA chairman and managing director Francis Gentle (son of William Gentle) announced that government restrictions on racing fixtures and excess profits taxation was affecting the business dividends. The taxation was the equivalent of £2,000 per day.

The headlines created during the year revolved around the success of two greyhounds Ballynennan Moon and Ballyhennessy Seal.

Ballynennan Moon
After a short rest during the winter the brindle dog won his first ten races and was again on course to beat Mick the Miller's world record for consecutive wins. However his attempt was unsuccessful when he was again beaten by Laughing Lackey, at White City. His career came to an end in the Stewards' Cup when he pulled up lame and was retired to stud. At stud he was the first stud dog in history to command a 100 guineas mating fee but he failed to sire any offspring of note. His career record read 65 wins from his 91 races in Britain and he won 38 trophies and £4,000 in prize money, a significant figure during the 1940s.

Ballyhennessy Seal
Ballyhennessy Seal moved from his Catford Stadium base to Wimbledon Stadium and was placed in the care of trainer Stan Martin. In the May Stakes at Stamford Bridge he set a new track and world record when clocking 27.64sec for the 500yds course. This was followed by an appearance in the Circuit at Walthamstow Stadium where another new track record was set. The track record time of 28.62 was recorded in the semi-finals with yet another track record of 28.59 coming in the final. The greyhound had set three track records in eight days and was still officially a puppy. Other competition wins included the Wembley Summer Cup, the Stewards Cup and the International.

Competitions
The 1943 Irish Greyhound Derby champion Famous Knight had left Ireland to race in the United Kingdom and reached the final of the 1944 Scottish Greyhound Derby, which was won by Gladstone Brigadier.

Ireland
The 1944 Irish Greyhound Derby was considered the best to date. Shelbourne Park entries included Mad Tanist, Tanimon, Fawn Cherry, Mountain Emperor, Fair Marquis, Clonbonny Bridge, Down Signal and Castledown Turn. A controversial final ended with Clonbonny Bridge defeating the early leader Down Signal in a disputed close finish.

As the year progressed and wartime restrictions were relaxed slightly it became apparent that British breeding (which was at an extreme low) could not supply the industry with enough greyhounds. This led to an export from Ireland to England of greyhounds valuing £434,685 during 1944.

News
Four top Irish-bred greyhounds were sold by Aldridges on 21 July, at their famous greyhound auctions. The four owned by Miss G Stockman from London and trained by Stan Biss went for a total of £3,370. Derryboy Jubilee topped the quartet at £1,312 followed by Puppy Derby champion Allardstown Playboy £997, Monarch of the Glen (Easter Cup and double St Leger winner) £619, with finally Slinkey sold for £441. It turned out to be a shrewd piece of business on the part of Stockman because only Derryboy Jubilee claimed further success winning the Wimbledon Gold Cup in 1945.

Principal races

Totalisator Returns

The totalisator returns declared to the licensing authorities for the year 1944 are listed below. Tracks that did not have a totalisator in operation are not listed.

Summary

References 

Greyhound racing in the United Kingdom
Greyhound racing in the Republic of Ireland
UK and Ireland Greyhound Racing Year
UK and Ireland Greyhound Racing Year
UK and Ireland Greyhound Racing Year
UK and Ireland Greyhound Racing Year